The Preston and Wigan Railway would have been an early British railway company operating in Lancashire. 

The Preston and Wigan Railway obtained an Act of Parliament on 22 April 1831 to build a  line between Wigan and Preston.

On 8 August 1833 the Board decided that it would be to their advantage to amalgamate with the Wigan Branch Railway, the directors of the Wigan Branch Railway met shortly thereafter and agreed with them. An Act of Parliament was approved and gained royal assent on 22 May 1834 incorporating the two railways as the North Union Railway. It was the first-ever amalgamation of railway companies.

The line opened formally on 21 October 1838 and to the public on 31 October.

Notes

References

Early British railway companies
Historic transport in Lancashire
Rail transport in Lancashire
History of the Metropolitan Borough of Wigan
Railway companies established in 1831
1831 establishments in the United Kingdom
British companies established in 1831